The 2007 National Pro Fastpitch season was the fourth season of professional softball under the name National Pro Fastpitch (NPF) for  the only professional women's fastpitch softball league in the United States.  From 1997 to 2002, NPF operated under the names Women's Pro Fastpitch (WPF) and Women's Pro Softball League (WPSL).   Each year, the playoff teams battle for the Cowles Cup.

Teams, cities and stadiums

Milestones and events
A number of changes to the NPF roster of teams happened in the offseason:

The Texas Thunder were sold to new ownership based in Rockford, Illinois.  They relocated there for the 2007 season and renamed themselves the Rockford Thunder.

In January 2007, the Connecticut Brakettes announced they would no longer participate in NPF.

In February, an expansion team named the Washington Glory was added to NPF, and the Glory inherited the contracts of players from the Brakettes.

Arizona Heat suspended play for the 2007 season.  Despite rumors to the contrary, the Heat never rejoined NPF.

NPF hired Cheri Kempf to be commissioner. Kempf's background includes pitching on the 1992 gold medal-winning United States national team in the World Cup in Beijing, China, producing instructional books and videos on softball, and announcing professional and college softball telecasts.

In March, the Akron Racers hired Shonda Stanton, the head softball coach at Marshall University to be field manager.

Player acquisition

College draft

The 2007 NPF Senior Draft was held February 14, 2007.  Lindsay Schutzler of Tennessee was selected first by the Chicago Bandits.

Notable transactions
Cat Osterman was drafted first in the 2006 NPF Draft by the Connecticut Brakettes.  She did not sign with them, becoming a free agent on September 30, 2006.  In December 2006, she signed a deal to join the Rockford Thunder.

League standings 
Source 

The Michigan Ice played a partial schedule in 2007, with hopes of receiving investor support in 2008 to become a full-time NPF member.  The Ice never became a full-time member. League games against Team China, Denso Japan professional softball team, the Venezuela national team and the Stratford Brakettes were also scheduled. The results counted in the NPF's team records.

NPF Championship

The 2007 NPF Championship Series was held at Sunset Point Park in Kimberly, Wisconsin August 24-6.  The top four teams qualified and were seeded based on the final standings.  The series matched the teams up in a double-elimination bracket.

League leaders

Batting leaders

Pitching leaders

Annual awards
Source:

See also

 List of professional sports leagues
 List of professional sports teams in the United States and Canada

References

External links 
 

Softball teams
2007 in women's softball
2007 in American women's sports
Softball in the United States